This page covers the period January - September 1985. The rest of 1985 is covered in 1985-86 in Argentine football.

Nacional 1985
1985 featured the last ever edition of the Nacional championship. The structure of the tournament made it the most complicated championship in the history of the Argentine first division. The eventual champions were Argentinos Juniors who beat Vélez Sársfield in a 2nd final.

Group Stages (1st step)
The top two teams go through to the winners knockout, the bottom two go to the losers knockout.

Group A

Group B

Group C

Group D

Group E

Group F

Group G

Group H

2nd step

Winners knockout
The winners progressed to the winners QF, the losers enter the losers 3rd round.

Losers knockout

3rd step
Winners Quarter-finals

Losers 3rd round

4th step
Winners Semi-finals

Losers 4th round

5th step
Winners final

Argentinos Juniors to play in the final
Vélez Sársfield progress to the losers final

Losers 5th round

6th step
Losers 6th round

7th step
Losers 7th round

8th step
Losers final

Vélez Sársfield to play in the final

Final
August 28, 1985

As Argentinos Juniors had made it to the final without losing a game, the final had to be replayed to give them the 2nd chance that every other team had already had.

September 3, 1985

References
Argentina final tables: 1980s by Osvaldo José Gorgazzi  at rsssf.

Seasons in Argentine football
1985 in Argentine football